Antoinette Louise Padmore Tubman (24 February 191418 May 2011) was the wife of the Liberian politician William S. Tubman and was First Lady of Liberia from 1948 until 1971.

Biography 
Antoinette Padmore was born in Monrovia on 24 February 1914. Her parents were James Stanley Padmore and Mary Louise Barclay-Padmore, who has both emigrated from Barbados. Her mother died when she was young, as a result she was brought up by her aunt Elizabeth Barclay-Sherman. She was educated at Bromley Mission, an episcopal school, then moved to Paris to study fashion. On her return she opened the first school of fashion and modelling in Monrovia. She married William Tubman on 17 September 1948. She was his third wife. They had one daughter, Wilhemina Tubman-Tucker.

Work as First Lady 
Tubman was First Lady of Liberia from her marriage in 1948 to the death of her husband in 1971. In the Executive Mansion she set up a museum with artefacts relating to her husband's presidency as well as previous ones. More significantly, Tubman used her influential role as First Lady raise funds and awareness for philanthropic and humanitarian causes, including: orphans, the homeless, the mentally ill. In August 1957, a new orphanage funded by the Antoinette Tubman Children's Welfare Foundation was opened in Virginia. In 1958 she set up a charity dedicated to fund-raising for a new hospital for the mentally ill in Monrovia. She was president of the Social Services Association. She was noted for her involvement in political life.

After her husband's death in July 1971, his estimated fortune of $220 million made her one of the richest women in the world.  She established the William V S Tubman Memorial Museum on their estate, east of Monrovia in Totota, based on the collection she founded early in their marriage.

As well as being First Lady, Tubman also ran two businesses: a motel and restaurant called Coocoo's Nest; a plantation and roasters called Wilmetco Coffee.

She died on 18 May 2011. She was buried on 11 June 2011 at the United Methodist Church, Monrovia.

Legacy 

The sports stadium in Monrovia was named the Antoinette Tubman Stadium in her honor.

Awards 
1956 - Grand Cross of the Order of Merit of the Federal Republic of Germany.

References 

1914 births
2011 deaths
First ladies and gentlemen of Liberia
Liberian human rights activists
Women human rights activists
People from Monrovia
Liberian political people
Grand Crosses Special Class of the Order of Merit of the Federal Republic of Germany
Liberian women's rights activists
Liberian people of Barbadian descent
Burials in Liberia